FK Třinec is a football club based in Třinec, Czech Republic. It plays in the Czech National Football League. It is sponsored by the Třinec Iron and Steel Works; in the past the club bore the name of the company.

The club's highest achievement was the presence in the Czechoslovak First League, where the club was present for six seasons in the 1960s and 1970s.

History

Czechoslovak era

In 1921 Polish population of the town of Třinec (Trzyniec) founded KS Siła Trzyniec, ethnically Polish sport club. In the same year local German population founded DSV Trzynietz. Two years later Czechs founded their own club SK Třinec. After the communist coup d'état of 1948, communists began to curb the number of organizations in Czechoslovakia and the Polish club was fused to the Czech one in 1952. The club played in the Czechoslovak First League for the first time in the 1963–64 season and returned to play three consecutive seasons there between 1970–71 and 1972–73. Two more seasons in the top flight followed in 1974–75 and 1975–76 before the club was relegated from the top flight.

Czech era
After the dissolution of Czechoslovakia, the club regularly took part in the Czech 2. Liga. An eight year spell there was followed by five years in the third-tier Moravian–Silesian Football League, before a return to the Second Division came in 2006. Another stint in the Second Division followed, this time lasting for six years until relegation in 2012. The club won the Moravian–Silesian Football League in the 2012–13 season.

Historic names

 KS Siła Trzyniec (1921–1923)
 SK Třinec (1923–1937)
 SK TŽ Třinec (1937–1950)
 Sokol Železárny Třinec (1950–1952)
 TŽ Třinec (1952–1953) (merged with KS Siła Trzyniec)
 DSO Baník Třinec (1953–1958)
  TJ TŽ Třinec (1958–1993)
 SK Železárny Třinec (1993–2000)
 FK Fotbal Třinec (2000–2022)
 FK Třinec (2022–)

Stadium

Their current home ground is Stadion Rudolfa Labaje, named after former famous local Polish footballer, Rudolf Łabaj. The stadium has a capacity of just over 2,000. The club previously played at Lesní stadion, which is now mainly used for athletics.

Players

Current squad
.

Out on loan

Notable former players

Managers

Miroslav Kouřil (2007–08)
Erich Cviertna (2008–09)
Jiří Neček (2009–10)
Zdeněk Dembinný (2010)
Patrik Krabec (2010)
Ľubomír Luhový (2010–12)
Miroslav Kouřil (2012–13)
Karel Kula (2013–14)
Marek Kalivoda (2014–15)
Radim Nečas (2015)
Karel Kula (2015–16)
Lubomír Vašek (2016)
Jiří Neček (2016–19)
Tomáš Jakus (2019)
Svatopluk Habanec (2019–20)
František Straka (2020–21)
Martin Zbončák (2021–present)

History in domestic competitions

 Seasons spent at Level 1 of the football league system: 0
 Seasons spent at Level 2 of the football league system: 26
 Seasons spent at Level 3 of the football league system: 10
 Seasons spent at Level 4 of the football league system: 0

Czech Republic

Honours
Moravian–Silesian Football League (third tier)
 Champions: 2012–13

References

External links
  

 
Association football clubs established in 1921
Trinec
Trinec
Sport in Třinec
1921 establishments in Czechoslovakia